Marcus Livius Drusus (155–108 BC) was a Roman politician who served as consul in 112 BC. He was also governor of Macedonia and campaigned successfully in Thrace against the Scordisci.

Early life 
Drusus was a son of Gaius Livius Drusus. He had a brother named Gaius Livius Drusus and a sister named Livia.

Tribunate 
Drusus was set up as tribune of the plebs by the Senate in 122 BC to undermine Gaius Gracchus' land reform bills. To do this (according to the record of Appian), he proposed creating twelve colonies with 3,000 settlers each from the poorer classes, and relieving rent on property distributed since 133 BC. He also said the Latin allies should not be mistreated by Roman generals, which was the counteroffer to Gracchus' offer of full citizenship. These were known as the Leges Liviae, but they were never enacted, because the Senate simply wanted to draw support away from Gracchus.

Their plan was successful. Drusus had just enough popular support to justify his veto of Gracchus' bills.

Consulship and later career 
Drusus was later consul in 112 BC and fought in Macedonia defeating the Scordisci, even pushing them out of Thrace across the Danube.

In 109 BC he was elected censor along with the elder Marcus Aemilius Scaurus. He died in office.

Family 
Drusus was married to a Cornelia, they had three known children:
 Marcus Livius Drusus, the famous tribune of 91 BC, whose murder incited the Italian Social War.
 Mamercus Aemilius Lepidus Livianus, the consul of 77 BC (adopted into the Aemilii Lepidi), who married the daughter of Sulla the dictator.
 Livia, the mother of Servilia and Cato the Younger.

References

Sources 
 

155 BC births
108 BC deaths
2nd-century BC Roman consuls
Marcus
Roman censors
Tribunes of the plebs